The 13th Congress of the Philippines (Filipino: Ikalabintatlong Kongreso ng Pilipinas), composed of the Philippine Senate and House of Representatives, met from July 26, 2004, until June 8, 2007, during the fourth, fifth, and sixth years of Gloria Macapagal Arroyo's presidency. The convening of the 13th Congress followed the 2004 national elections, which replaced half of the Senate membership and the entire membership of the House of Representatives.

Events

Charter Change
President Gloria Macapagal Arroyo, in her several State of the Nation Addresses has repeatedly called on Congress to pave the way for the amending of the 1987 Constitution to provide for a unicameral–parliamentary–federal form of government. On December 8, 2006, the administration-dominated House of Representatives, bypassing the Senate, passed in haste House Resolution 1450, which called on Congress to convene into a Constituent Assembly (ConAss) to propose amendments to the Constitution.
The House move however, was faced with stiff opposition from the outmaneuvered members of the opposition and all but 1 member of the Senate, which was later bolstered by support from several sectors of the civil society and the influential Roman Catholic Church, which threatened to hold nationwide protest rallies to denounce the House move. Succumbing to the mounting opposition and the apparent withdrawal of support of the President, House Speaker Jose De Venecia later on scrapped the entire resolution and called instead for a constitutional convention, challenging the Senate to concur it in 72 hours. But this too was rejected by the Senate, which preferred to hold a constitutional convention after the 2007 elections. Efforts to amend the constitution during the 13th Congress were eventually shelved.

Sessions
First Regular Session: July 26, 2004 – June 7, 2005
First Special Session: January 5 – February 10, 2005
Second Special Session: March 1 – April 1, 2005
Second Regular Session: July 25, 2005 – June 5, 2006
Third Regular Session: July 24, 2006 – June 8, 2007
Third Special Session: February 19 – 20, 2007
Special Centennial Session: June 7, 2007

Legislation
Laws passed by the 13th Congress: 149 (Republic Act No. 9333 to 9495), as of September 7, 2007

Major legislation
Republic Act No. 9334 — Increase of Excise Tax on Alcohol and Tobacco Products
Republic Act No. 9335 — Attrition Act of 2005
Republic Act No. 9337 — Expanded Value-Added Tax Law
Republic Act No. 9341 — Rent Control Act of 2005
Republic Act No. 9343 — Special Purpose Vehicle Act of 2002 Amendments
Republic Act No. 9344 — Juvenile Justice and Welfare Act of 2006
Republic Act No. 9346 — Death Penalty Abolition
Republic Act No. 9347 — Rationalizing the Composition and Functions of the National Labor Relations Commission
Republic Act No. 9359 — Appropriation of a Standby Fund for the Guimaras Oil Spill Clean Up, Mayon Volcano Relief Operations, OFW Repatriation
Republic Act No. 9367 — Biofuels Act of 2006
Republic Act No. 9369 — Amending the Election Modernization Act
Republic Act No. 9372 — Human Security Act of 2007
Republic Act No. 9379 — Handline Fishing Law
Republic Act No. 9396 — Redefining the term "Veteran"
Republic Act No. 9399 — One-Time Amnesty for Businesses in the Special Economic Zones and Freeports
Republic Act No. 9400 — Amending the Bases Conversion and Development Act of 1992
Republic Act No. 9406 —Reorganization and Strengthening of the Public Attorney's Office
Republic Act No. 9416 — Unlawful Cheating in the Civil Service Commission Examinations
Republic Act No. 9417 — Strengthening the Office of the Solicitor General
Republic Act No. 9418 —Institutionalizing Strategy for Rural Development
Republic Act No. 9422 — Amending the Migration Workers and Overseas Act of 1995
Republic Act No. 9433 — Magna Carta for Public Social Workers

Leadership

Senate
President of the Senate
Franklin M. Drilon (Liberal)
Manuel Villar (Nacionalista), elected on July 24, 2006
Senate President Pro-Tempore
Juan M. Flavier (Lakas-CMD)
Majority Floor Leader
Francis N. Pangilinan (Liberal)
Minority Floor Leader
Aquilino Pimentel, Jr. (PDP–Laban)

House of Representatives
Speaker of the House of Representatives
Jose C. de Venecia, Jr. (Lakas-CMD, 4th District Pangasinan)
Deputy Speakers
Luzon:
Emilio R. Espinosa (NPC, 2nd District Masbate)
Visayas:
Raul V. del Mar (Lakas-CMD, 1st District Cebu City)
Mindanao:
Abdulgani A. Salapuddin (Lakas-CMD, Lone District Basilan)
Central Luzon:
Benigno S. Aquino III (Liberal, 2nd District Tarlac)
Eric D. Singson (Liberal, 2nd District Ilocos Sur), elected February 21, 2006.
Majority Floor Leader
Prospero C. Nograles (Lakas-CMD, 1st District Davao City)
Minority Floor Leader
Francis Joseph G. Escudero (NPC, 1st District Sorsogon)

Members

Composition

Senate

House of Representatives
The term of office of the current members of the House of Representatives is from June 30, 2004, to June 30, 2007.

District representatives

Notes

Party-list representatives

Notes

References

External links

Further reading
Philippine House of Representatives Congressional Library

See also
Congress of the Philippines
Senate of the Philippines
House of Representatives of the Philippines
2004 Philippine general election

Congresses of the Philippines
Fifth Philippine Republic